Alexander Vladimirovich Riazantsev (born March 15, 1980) is a Russian former professional ice hockey defenseman. He played several seasons in the Kontinental Hockey League (KHL) before retiring in 2015. He also played several years in the American Hockey League, after being selected by the Colorado Avalanche in the 1998 NHL Entry Draft, though did not play in the NHL. Internationally Riazantsev played for the Russian national team at the 2005 World Championship, winning a bronze medal.

Playing career
Originally drafted by the Colorado Avalanche in 1998, Riazantsev spent parts of five seasons playing for the Hershey Bears of the American Hockey League before returning to Russia in 2003, where he played until his retirement.

In January 2012, Riazantsev took a shot in a skills competition that measured a speed of 114.1 miles per hour. It is considered by KHL officials to be the hardest shot ever recorded. The National Hockey League does not recognize this feat, as the puck travels a shorter distance to the goal net in KHL competitions than in those of the NHL.

On May 5, 2012, Riazantsev joined his seventh club in just five seasons, signing a two-year contract as a free agent with the Severstal Cherepovets starting from the 2012–13 season. During the season, Riazantsev scored 9 goals from the Blueline and contributed with 20 points.

On June 11, 2013, Riazantsev was traded by Severstal to return to his original club, Spartak Moscow, in exchange for Nicholas Bushuev.

On October 4, 2014, Riazantsev continued his journeyman career when he was traded after only 8 games in the 2014–15 season with HC Neftekhimik Nizhnekamsk to Amur Khabarovsk.

Career statistics

Regular season and playoffs

International

References

External links

1980 births
Living people
Amur Khabarovsk players
Avangard Omsk players
Avtomobilist Yekaterinburg players
Colorado Avalanche draft picks
HC Donbass players
HC Dynamo Moscow players
Hershey Bears players
Lokomotiv Yaroslavl players
Milwaukee Admirals players
HC Neftekhimik Nizhnekamsk players
Russian ice hockey defencemen
Salavat Yulaev Ufa players
Severstal Cherepovets players
SKA Saint Petersburg players
HC Spartak Moscow players
Traktor Chelyabinsk players
Victoriaville Tigres players
HC Vityaz players